The Royal Commission on Civil Liability and Compensation for Personal Injury, better known as the Pearson commission was a United Kingdom royal commission, established in 1973 under the chairmanship of Lord Pearson. The commission reported in 1978 and made radical recommendations for tort reform, Pearson believing that tort's traditional role of compensation had become outdated with the rise of the welfare state since the end of World War II. He saw the benefits system as having the primary role of providing compensation and security following an accident, and litigation as being secondary. As a result, the commission recommended a no-fault insurance scheme for road traffic and industrial accidents, similar to the subsequent New Zealand Accident Compensation Corporation, and a scheme of strict liability for consumer protection. However, the government's response was cool and the recommendations were not followed up, much to Pearson's disappointment.

Terms of reference 
The commission's terms of reference were:

Members
The commission's members were:
Lord Pearson (chairman)
Lord Allen of Abbeydale
Lord Cameron
Walter Anderson, former general secretary, National and Local Government Officers Association
Norman Marsh QC, Law Commission
Prof. Richard Schilling, former professor of occupational health, London School of Hygiene and Tropical Medicine
Ronald Skerman, chief actuary, Prudential Assurance Company
Margaret Brooke, former vice-chairman (sic) National Federation of Women's Institutes
Prof. Robert Duthie, Nuffield Professor of orthopaedic surgery, Oxford University
Robert MacCrindle QC
Denis Marshall, solicitor, member of the council of the Law Society of England and Wales
Prof. Alan Prest, professor of economics, London School of Economics
A. Sansom, managing director, Iron Trades Employers Federation
Prof. Olive Stevenson, head of department of social policy and social work, Keele University
James Stewart WS
Alan Ure, director, Trollope & Colls

Recommendations
Recovery of damages in tort - no profound changes were recommended but deduction from damages for social security benefits received was recommended and this was subsequently implemented. There was a further recommendation for the introduction of structured settlements but this was not implemented until 1 April 2005 and without the inflation-proofing that the commission had recommended.

Work injuries - a no-fault insurance scheme administered by the Department of Health and Social Security (DHSS), financed by employers and providing benefits at the level of the State Earnings-Related Pension Scheme. The scheme was also proposed to extend to the self-employed and injuries incurred during commuting.

Road injuries - a no-fault insurance scheme administered by the DHSS, financed by a levy on petrol, estimated at 1p per gallon (0.8p per litre at 2003 prices)

Air transport, Sea and inland waterways - the commission noted that this was largely constrained by international conventions such as the Warsaw Convention but regretted the low level of settlements allowed.

Rail transport - a no-fault scheme was rejected in favour of proposed strict liability for accidents arising from movement of rolling stock.

Products liability - a no-fault scheme was rejected and the strict liability scheme drafted by the Council of Europe and the Commission of the European Union favoured. These European initiatives ultimately led to European Community Directive 85/374/EEC and the Consumer Protection Act 1987.

Services in general - retention of existing remedies for the tort of negligence.

Medical injuries - a no-fault scheme was not recommended but the commission held that the New Zealand and Sweden experience should be studied and reviewed. Strict liability for injury to human volunteers in clinical trials was recommended. No such strict liability was introduced and subsequent volunteers often faced complex litigation as following the disastrous TGN1412 trial in 2006.

Children - The commission proposed a general benefit for severely disabled children, no matter how their disability was caused, to be financed from general taxation.

Vaccine damage - The commission proposed that this would be compensated by the general benefit for severely disabled children. Where vaccination took place on the recommendation of the government, strict liability was proposed.

Ante-natal injury - The commission proposed that this would be compensated by the general benefit for severely disabled children and by strict liability such as it applied to pharmaceuticals. The provisions of the Congenital Disabilities (Civil Liability) Act 1976 should be restricted as it affected family members.

Occupiers' liability - no change to law on occupiers' liability save the introduction of the Law Commissions recommendations on liability to trespassers which ultimately led to the Occupiers' Liability Act 1984.

Criminal injuries - activities of Criminal Injuries Compensation Authority endorsed and to be reviewed in the light of proposals for civil liability.

Animals - no change save for aligning Scottish law with that of England and Wales and Northern Ireland.

Exceptional risks - strict liability on "controllers of things or operations that by their unusually hazardous nature require supervision because of their potential for causing death or personal injury."

Reception
The Labour government expressed some caution over the recommendations, especially those as to no-fault compensation. The Conservative Party and insurance industry were hostile. The Conservative Party came to power in the 1979 United Kingdom general election and by 1983, the no-fault proposals, though not explicitly rejected, were falling into neglect.

References

Bibliography 
 [Various authors] (1978) Royal Commission on Civil Liability and Compensation for Personal Injury, Stationery Office, Cmnd. 7054
 
 

1978 in the United Kingdom
Tort law
British Royal Commissions
1973 establishments in the United Kingdom
Law reform in the United Kingdom